Johan Johansson may refer to:
 Johan Johansson (musician) (b. 1961), Swedish musician
 Johan Johansson i Kälkebo (1866–1928), Swedish politician
 Johan Petter Johansson (1853–1943), also known as JP Johansson, Swedish inventor and industrialist
 Johan J. Johansson (1870–1948, American Naval seaman, Medal of Honor recipient
 Jóhann Jóhannsson (1969–2018), Icelandic composer